Asaeli Tuivuaka (born 22 December 1995) is a Fijian rugby union player. His usual position is wing or Centre. He currently plays for French Top14 team Racing 92.

Personal life
His uncle Setefano Cakau captained Fiji in rugby sevens. His brother Mario Senimoli played rugby sevens for Tabadamu Rugby Club in Fiji but died on the pitch in training in 2011.

Career
In 2017 he was named in Fijian Drua squad for Australian National Rugby Championship.
He made his senior international debut in 2019.
He was named in the victorious Fiji squad for the Rugby sevens at the 2020 Summer Olympics.
For 2021–22 United Rugby Championship he signed for Zebre Parma. The next season he signed for Paris based club Racing 92.

References

External links

It's Rugby France profile

1995 births
Living people
Fijian rugby union players
Fijian rugby sevens players
Olympic rugby sevens players of Fiji
Rugby sevens players at the 2020 Summer Olympics
Medalists at the 2020 Summer Olympics
Olympic gold medalists for Fiji
Olympic medalists in rugby sevens
Fijian Drua players
Zebre Parma players
Rugby union wings